Achada Grande is a settlement in the northeastern part of the island of Fogo, Cape Verde. It is situated near the coast, 6 km southeast of Mosteiros. Its population was 538 in 2010. Nearby settlements include Corvo to the north and Relva to the southeast.

See also
List of villages and settlements in Cape Verde

References

Villages and settlements in Fogo, Cape Verde
Mosteiros, Cape Verde